A by-election for the seat of Barkly in the Northern Territory Legislative Assembly was held on 5 September 1987. Ian Tuxworth's election to the seat of Barkly was declared void after independent candidate Maggie Hickey challenged the result on the basis that the Labor candidate, Keith Hallet, held British nationality and was not an Australian citizen. Due to the close result (Tuxworth had won by only 19 votes), Justice John Nader voided the election on 30 July 1987.

Ian Tuxworth would recontest as the NT Nationals candidate and Maggie Hickey would recontest as the Labor candidate.

Result

References

1987 elections in Australia
Northern Territory by-elections
1980s in the Northern Territory